is a railway station in the city of Toyama, Toyama Prefecture, Japan, operated by the private railway operator Toyama Chihō Railway.

Lines

Station layout 
The station has one ground-level side platform serving a single bi-directional track. The station is unattended.

History
Asanamachi Station was opened on 25 April 1958.

Adjacent stations

Surrounding area 
Toyama Horikawa Minami Elementary School

See also
 List of railway stations in Japan

External links

  

Railway stations in Toyama Prefecture
Railway stations in Japan opened in 1958
Stations of Toyama Chihō Railway